Lenora Mandella (4 May 1931 - 12 August 2005) played shortstop and pitcher in the All-American Girls Professional Baseball League between 1949 and 1951. She both batted and threw right-handed.  Her nickname was Smokey.  She measured 5 feet 7 inches and weighed 145 pounds.

Born in McKeesport, Pennsylvania, Lenora became a pioneer in women's baseball, and was featured in the Hall of Fame in Cooperstown, NY on November 6, 1988.  As well, she was a local duckpin bowler. She worked for the Glasshouse in Glassport, Operating Engineers Local 66 Insurance Fund in Monroeville and Copperweld until she retired.  She died in Herminie, PA.

Baseball beginnings
Lenora first began her involvement in baseball when Philip K. Wrigley owner of the Chicago Cubs financed the league in the mid-1940s, when a lot of the men were called up to serve in World War II.  In 1949, Lenora attended a tryout at McKeesport's Renziehausen Park.  From that, she was sent on a trip to Sound Bend, Indiana for spring training. According to her friend Norma Dearfield, "she had a pretty good arm."

Lenora played for the Peoria Redwings (in 1951), the South Bend Blue Sox (in 1949), and the Springfield Sallies (in 1950).

After baseball
Following her baseball career, Lenora coached softball for many years. Even in her later years, she received requests from local slow-pitch softball coaches to help out with practice.  In terms of hobbies, she had a real love of cats, taking in as many as 22 stray cats at one time.  She never married and, upon her death, was survived by her brother, Bernard, from Ligonier.

Career statistics
Seasonal Pitching Records

Seasonal Batting Records

Sources
. AAGPBL 
. Google Books 
. Pittsburgh Post-Gazette 

1931 births
2005 deaths
Baseball players from Pennsylvania
All-American Girls Professional Baseball League players
American female baseball players
20th-century American women
20th-century American people
21st-century American women